Andorra competed at the 1984 Summer Olympics in Los Angeles, United States This was Andorra's third participation at the Summer Olympic Games, after its apparition in 1976 in Montreal (Canada) and in 1980 in Moscow (USSR).
Two Andorran athletes, both shooters, were selected and participated: Joan Tomàs Roca (who has also flag bearer during the opening ceremony) and Francesc Gaset Fris.

Shooting

References

Official Olympic Reports
sports-reference

Nations at the 1984 Summer Olympics
1984
1984 in Andorra